The Renault Voiturette (Renault Little Car) was Renault's first ever produced automobile, and was manufactured between 1898 and 1903. The name was used for five models.
The first Voiturettes mounted De Dion-Bouton engines. Continental tires were used for the car, a make still used for several modern Renaults today.

Voiturette Type A

The first Voiturette was designed by the maker's creator Louis Renault in 1898. The first Voiturette was sold to a friend of Louis' father after going for a ride with Louis along Rue Lepic on December 24, 1898. Twelve more cars were sold that night. The main reason for the man to buy the car was the incredible ability of the car to climb streets without any difficulty and its fuel economy.

Voiturette Type B
The Type B was basically the same Voiturette. However, the difference was the strange aspect of the car, including a roof and two doors. Louis Renault invented the sedan in 1899.

Voiturette Type C
The Type C was Renault's first four-passenger car. After several mechanical and physical modifications, the car was launched in 1900.
The car was presented in the 1900 Mondial de l'Automobile at Paris, presenting for the first time Renault Frères as an automobile maker.

A not coachworked Type C has raced in the 9° Trofeo Milano (an Italian regularity rally) in 2015.

Voiturette Type D/E

The Type D and E Voiturettes were similar to the Type C but with some differences, mostly the 5CV upgraded engine. The Type D was identical to the Type C excepting the retractable roof and the Type E showed a longer roof than that of the Type B, but without any door.
The Type G used the same chassis and body style than the Type D and E but with an upgraded engine.

Voiturette Type G

The first model produced by Renault was the Voiturette, it was offered in 3 major iterations with this one being the final and most evolved of the designs – the Type G. The single-cylinder Voiturette powered by an 864cc water-cooled De Dion motor rated at 8 horsepower. The distinctive twin, side-mounted radiators had been initially implemented when water-cooling was introduced in 1900 on the earlier Type C, they were then enlarged for the Type G.

The front and rear semi-elliptical springs gave the Voiturette quite a comfortable ride for the era, the thumping De Dion engine powering the model to numerous race victories in France and around Europe.

References

Voiturette
First car made by manufacturer
Vehicles introduced in 1898
1890s cars
1900s cars
Veteran vehicles